Alexey Ivanovich Voyevoda (born 9 May 1980) is a Russian bobsledder, professional armwrestler and politician.

Bobsleigh
A professional bobsleigher since 2002, Voyevoda won silver in the four-man bobsleigh event with teammates Philippe Egorov, Alexei Seliverstov, and Alexandre Zoubkov at the 2006 Winter Olympics in Turin. He also won a bronze in the two-man event at the 2008 FIBT World Championships in Altenberg, Germany. At the 2010 Winter Olympics in Vancouver, Voyevoda won a bronze in the two-man event. At the 2014 Winter Olympics in Sochi, Voyevoda initially won a gold medal in the two-man event and a gold medal in the four-man event. Voyevoda received the Order For Merit to the Fatherland Award 4th class with Russian President Vladimir Putin handing the state awards.

On 24 November 2017, he was stripped of the 2014 Olympic medals by the International Olympic Committee, following the doping violation of his bobsledding partner Aleksandr Zubkov. On 18 December 2017, Voyevoda received a personal lifetime ban from the Olympic Games due to doping violations at the 2014 Winter Olympics.

On 1 February 2018, the CAS removed the sanctions from Alexey Negodaylo and Dmitry Trunenkov in bobsleigh, but upheld them on their teammates Alexandr Zubkov and Alexey Voyevoda.

Arm wrestling
Voyevoda holds a good deal of recognition as a professional arm wrestler, having also secured several Russian arm wrestling championships. His triumph over legendary arm-wrestler John Brzenk was immortalized in the feature-length documentary, "Pulling John", directed by Vassiliki Khonsari and Sevan Matossian. The film "Pulling John" also chronicles his life and training in Russia. He was defeated by Travis Bagent at the 2003 WAF championship, but won the Zloty Tur 2004 cup one year later, defeating high level arm wrestlers such as Bagent, Brzenk, Matt Girdner, and Alexey Semerenko. Voyevoda reclaimed the WAF championship in 2004 (left- and right-handed) and won the European Championship the same year. After a left-hand vendetta match with Alexey Semerenko (winning 4–2) and Travis Bagent (losing 5–1) in 2005, Voyevoda took a break from his professional arm wrestling career to return to bobsleigh training until 2007. As of 2007, Alexey Voyevoda returned to the arm wrestling scene once again, winning a vendetta match 6–0 against Michael Todd in Bulgaria on 26 May. After that brief comeback, he resigned from the arm wrestling scene due to his bobsleigh and Olympic judo training until February 2016. In February 2016 Voevoda decided to return to arm wrestling and faced Tim Bresnan, but failed to produce the skills and power he once had, ultimately losing the fight 5-1.

Politics
Following the September 2016 elections in Russia, Voyevoda became a state deputy from Krasnodar Krai, representing the ruling party, United Russia.

Personal life
Voyevoda is a vegan.

References

External links

Armpower.net- News, Armpower magazine, Vendetta, pictures, ranking, links etc.
Bobsleigh four-man Olympic medalists for 1924, 1932–56, and since 1964
Bobsleigh two-man world championship medalists since 1931
World of Armwrestling- News, videoclips, pictures, profiles, results, tournament calendar, ranking, links etc.
Photo Gallery and forum
Video:  Miscellaneous Training and Competition Clips
Videos with Alexey Voevoda

1980 births
21st-century Russian politicians
Living people
People from Chernihiv Oblast
Russian male bobsledders
Russian arm wrestlers
United Russia politicians
Olympic medalists in bobsleigh
Bobsledders at the 2006 Winter Olympics
Bobsledders at the 2010 Winter Olympics
Bobsledders at the 2014 Winter Olympics
Olympic bobsledders of Russia
Olympic silver medalists for Russia
Olympic bronze medalists for Russia
Medalists at the 2010 Winter Olympics
Medalists at the 2006 Winter Olympics
Russian sportsperson-politicians
Competitors stripped of Winter Olympics medals
Recipients of the Medal of the Order "For Merit to the Fatherland" II class
Russian sportspeople in doping cases
Doping cases in bobsleigh
Seventh convocation members of the State Duma (Russian Federation)
People from Varva, Chernihiv Oblast